One Piece is an anime series adapted from the manga of the same title written by Eiichiro Oda. Produced by Toei Animation, and directed by Konosuke Uda, Munehisa Sakai, and Hiroaki Miyamoto, the ninth through the fourteenth seasons were broadcast on Fuji Television from May 21, 2006 to September 25, 2011. One Piece follows the adventures of Monkey D. Luffy, a 17-year-old boy, whose body has gained the properties of rubber from accidentally eating a supernatural fruit, and his crew of diverse pirates, named the Straw Hat Pirates. Luffy's greatest ambition is to obtain the world's ultimate treasure, One Piece, and thereby become the next King of the Pirates. The series uses 42 different pieces of theme music: 24 opening themes and 18 closing themes. Several CDs that contain the theme music and other tracks have been released by Toei Animation. The first DVD compilation was released on February 21, 2001, with individual volumes releasing monthly. The Singaporean company Odex released part of the series locally in English and Japanese in the form of dual audio Video CDs.

The first unedited, bilingual DVD box set, containing 13 episodes, was released on May 27, 2008. Similarly sized sets followed with 31 sets released as of July 2015. Episodes began streaming on August 29, 2009. Funimation's uncut dub later resumed airing on Adult Swim's revived Toonami programming block from episode 207 onwards from May 2013 until it was removed from the schedule in March 2017 after episode 384. Toonami would eventually bring the series back in January 2022, starting on episode 517.

Episode list

Season 9: Enies Lobby (2006–07)

Season 10: Thriller Bark (2008)

Season 11: Sabaody Archipelago (2008–09)

Season 12: Island of Women (2009)

Season 13: Impel Down (2009–10)

Season 14: Marineford (2010–11)

OVAs

Releases

Japanese

DVD

English
In Australia, the Season releases are named Collection 22 through 42 and the Collection Boxes are named Treasure Chest Collections.

Notes

References

Episodes
One Piece episodes